Hialeah Hospital is a 378-bed acute care hospital started by Seventh-day Adventist physicians based on the health and Christian principles advocated by the Seventh-day Adventist Church, with the motto: "Christian Care Through Modern Medical Science." It is located in Hialeah, Florida with a medical staff of over 900 employees. It has grown to be one of the largest private hospitals in Florida. Hospital services include a Senior ER and an Acute Care for the Elderly (ACE) unit.

History
In 1951, the hospital opened in  Hialeah in northwest Miami-Dade County, Florida. A Seventh-day Adventist minister, Elder W. 0. Reynolds, then pastor of the Miami Temple church, bought a block of land, with a down payment of $5,000 and a mortgage for $45,000. The hospital was set up in the largest of three buildings on the property, with doctors' offices, laboratory and X ray and maternity in the others.

The medical staff began with Dr. Laurin Lundy Andrews, an Adventist physician who had been the superintendent of the Florida Sanatorium and Benevolent Association facility in Orlando and Dr. Albert. W. McCorkle, whose home was Lake Worth, Florida, and began his practice at the Hialeah Hospital in November, 1951.

By 1956 the original 30-bed capacity was inadequate, and financial resources were sufficient to begin a program of expansion. At that time six additional patient rooms were added, and the capacity was increased to 50 beds. The addition included a large main nursing station and a surgery unit consisting of three operating rooms and a central supply room. The doctors' building, which houses the offices and examining rooms of four physicians, was built at the same time.

As dramatic growth elevated Hialeah to the eighth-largest city in the State of Florida, Hialeah Hospital has grown to be one of the largest privately owned hospitals in the state. Due to the rapid influx of Hispanic-Americans, the hospital became largely bilingual in both Spanish and English.

Hialeah Hospital was acquired from Tenet Healthcare, which had owned it for over three decades, by Steward Health Care in August 2021.

Services
Hialeah Hospital has served central to north Miami-Dade County since 1951. Hialeah Hospital offers a broad range of health care services, including 24-hour emergency care, cardiology, neurosurgery, obstetrics, a Level II Neonatal Intensive Care Unit, laboratory, a surgical weight loss program that has been designated a Center of Excellence by the American Society for Bariatric Surgery, and a complement of imaging services.

Hialeah Hospital received the Get With The Guidelines®–Heart Failure Gold Performance Achievement Award from the American Heart Association, which signifies that Hialeah Hospital has reached an aggressive goal of treating heart failure patients with 85% compliance for at least 24 months to core standard levels of care as outlined by the American Heart Association/American College of Cardiology secondary prevention guidelines for heart failure patients. Hialeah Hospital is fully accredited by the Joint Commission on the Accreditation of Healthcare Organizations, the nation's oldest and largest hospital accreditation agency.
Services Include:

 Heart Care
 Acute Care Unit for the Elderly
 Sleep Disorders
 Surgery
 24-hour Emergency Services,
 Women's Services
 Imaging
 Weight Loss Surgery Program
 Maternity Care

References

External links 
 

Hospital buildings completed in 1951
Hospitals in Florida
Former Seventh-day Adventist institutions